William Maxwell (1581–1641), or (1619–1669), was a Scottish physician and writer, physician in ordinary to Charles I of England. He is known for his work De Medicina Magnetica (1679), and as a follower of Robert Fludd.

Sources
Nicholas Goodrick-Clarke The Western Esoteric Traditions, Oxford University Press (2008).

Notes

17th-century Scottish medical doctors
16th-century births
Scottish writers
17th-century births